The 1893–94 Northern Football League season was the fifth in the history of the Northern Football League, a football competition in Northern England.

Clubs

The league featured 3 clubs which competed in the last season, along with five new clubs:
 South Bank
 Bishop Auckland
 Whitby
 North Skelton Rovers
 Darlington St. Augustine's

League table

References

1893-94
1893–94 in English association football leagues